Jonathan Paul Dyson (born 18 December 1971) is an English former professional footballer who played as a central defender.

A Business Studies graduate from Huddersfield University, Dyson now works full-time as an independent financial advisor based in Bradford.

External links

References

1971 births
Living people
Sportspeople from Mirfield
English footballers
Association football defenders
English Football League players
Huddersfield Town A.F.C. players
Nuneaton Borough F.C. players
Farsley Celtic A.F.C. players
Alumni of the University of Huddersfield
Sportspeople from Yorkshire